The miller (Acronicta leporina) is a moth of the family Noctuidae. It is found throughout Europe apart from the far south-east. The range extends from the South of Spain, Central Italy and Bulgaria to Scotland and  Central Scandinavia, crossing the Arctic circle in Finland and Norway. Outside Europe it is only known in North Africa. In the Eastern Palearctic and the Nearctic realm it is replaced  by Acronicta vulpina, (Grote, 1883) formerly known as Acronicta leporina subspecies vulpina.

Description
This is a variable but always distinctive species, the forewings ranging from almost white to dark grey (pale grey being the most common colour form) with characteristic crescent-shaped black markings. The hindwings are white. The wingspan is 1.5-1.69 in (38–43 mm). Adults of this species fly at night from June to August  and will come to light and sugar but are not especially strongly attracted.

Technical description and variation

Forewing white, the lines indicated by black spots. Larva pale green, or yellowish, with long silky white hairs, which are also sometimes yellowish, curling over the sides; — ab. bradyporina Tr. (3a), occurring in N. Europe and the commoner form in Britain, has the wings dusted with grey, and the markings more developed. — ab. semivirga Tutt has the outer margin of forewing broadly grey. — In leporella Stgr. (= cineracea Graes.) (3 a) confined to Eastern Asia and Japan, the forewing is greyish white with indistinct markings. — ab. rosea Tutt (= la rose Engr.) is said to have the forewing and the segmental incisions of abdomen of a bright rose colour.

Biology
The larva is green, covered in long white or yellow hairs. It feeds on a variety of trees (see list below), often feeding on bark and soft wood. This species overwinters as a pupa, sometimes spending two winters in this form.

Recorded food plants 

 Acer - Norway maple
 Alnus - alder
 Betula - birch
 Corylus - hazel
 Fagus - beech
 Nicotiana - tobacco
 Populus - poplar
 Quercus - oak
 Salix - willow
 Sorbus - whitebeam and allies

Notes
The flight season refers to the British Isles. This may vary in other parts of the range.

References 

Chinery, Michael Collins Guide to the Insects of Britain and Western Europe 1986 (Reprinted 1991)
Skinner, Bernard Colour Identification Guide to Moths of the British Isles 1984

External links

The Miller on UKmoths

Fauna Europaea
Lepiforum.de

Acronicta
Moths described in 1758
Moths of Europe
Moths of Africa
Insects of the Arctic
Taxa named by Carl Linnaeus